A spatial reference system (SRS) or coordinate reference system (CRS) is a framework used to precisely measure locations on the surface of the Earth as coordinates. It is thus the application of the abstract mathematics of coordinate systems and analytic geometry to geographic space. A particular SRS specification (for example, "Universal Transverse Mercator WGS 84 Zone 16N") comprises a choice of Earth ellipsoid, horizontal datum, map projection (except in the geographic coordinate system), origin point, and unit of measure. Thousands of coordinate systems have been specified for use around the world or in specific regions and for various purposes, necessitating transformations between different SRS. 

Although they date to the Hellenic Period, spatial reference systems are now a crucial basis for the sciences and technologies of Geoinformatics, including cartography, geographic information systems, surveying, remote sensing, and civil engineering. This has led to their standardization in international specifications such as the EPSG codes and ISO 19111:2007 Geographic information—Spatial referencing by coordinates, prepared by ISO/TC 211, also published by the Open Geospatial Consortium as Abstract Specification, Topic 2: Spatial referencing by coordinate.

Types of systems

The thousands of spatial reference systems used today are based on a few general strategies, which have been defined in the EPSG, ISO, and OGC standards:
Geographic coordinate system (or geodetic)
A spherical coordinate system measuring locations directly on the Earth (modeled as a sphere or  ellipsoid) using latitude (degrees north or south of the equator) and longitude (degrees west or east of a prime meridian).
Geocentric coordinate system (or Earth-centered Earth-fixed) 
A three-dimensional cartesian coordinate system that models the Earth as a three-dimensional object, measuring locations from a center point, usually the center of mass of the Earth, along x, y, and z axes aligned with the equator and the prime meridian. This system is commonly used to track the orbits of satellites, because they are based on the center of mass. Thus, this is the internal coordinate system used by Satellite navigation systems such as  GPS to compute locations using multilateration.
Projected coordinate system (or planar, grid) 
A standardized cartesian coordinate system that models the Earth (or more commonly, a large region thereof) as a plane, measuring locations from an arbitrary origin point along x and y axes more or less aligned with the cardinal directions. Each of these systems is based on a particular Map projection to create a planar surface from the curved Earth surface. These are generally defined and used strategically to minimize the distortions inherent to projections. Common examples include the Universal transverse mercator (UTM) and national systems such as the  British National Grid, and State Plane Coordinate System (SPCS).
Engineering coordinate system (or local, custom)
A cartesian coordinate system (2-D or 3-D) that is created bespoke for a small area, often a single engineering project, over which the curvature of the Earth can be safely approximated as flat without significant distortion. Locations are typically measured directly from an arbitrary origin point using surveying techniques. These may or may not be aligned with a standard projected coordinate system. Local tangent plane coordinates are a type of local coordinate system used in aviation and marine vehicles.

These standards acknowledge that standard reference systems also exist for measuring elevation using vertical datums and  time (e.g. ISO 8601), which may be combined with a spatial reference system to form a compound coordinate system for representing three-dimensional and/or spatio-temporal locations. There are also internal systems for measuring location within the context of an object, such as the rows and columns of pixels in a  raster image, Linear referencing measurements along linear features (e.g., highway mileposts), and systems for specifying location within moving objects such as ships. The latter two are often classified as subcategories of engineering coordinate systems.

Components
The goal of any spatial reference system is to create a common reference frame in which locations can be measured precisely and consistently as coordinates, which can then be shared unambiguously, so that any recipient can identify the same location that was originally intended by the originator. To accomplish this, any coordinate reference system definition needs to be composed of several specifications:
 A coordinate system, an abstract framework for measuring locations. Like any mathematical coordinate system, its definition consists of a measurable space (whether a plane, a three-dimension void, or the surface of an object such as the Earth), an origin point, a set of axis vectors emanating from the origin, and a unit of measure.
 A horizontal datum, which binds the abstract coordinate system to the real space of the Earth. A horizontal datum can be defined as a precise reference framework for measuring  geographic coordinates (latitude and longitude). Examples include the World Geodetic System and the 1927 and 1983 North American Datum. A datum generally consists of an estimate of the shape of the Earth (usually an ellipsoid), and one or more anchor points or control points, established locations (often marked by physical monuments) for which the measurement is documented.
 A definition for a projected CRS must also include a choice of map projection to convert the spherical coordinates specified by the datum into cartesian coordinates on a planar surface.
 
Thus, a CRS definition will typically consist of a "stack" of dependent specifications, as exemplified in the following table:

Examples by continent
Examples of systems around the world are:

Asia
Chinese Global Navigation Grid Code, China
Israeli Cassini Soldner, Israel
Israeli Transverse Mercator, Israel
Jordan Transverse Mercator, Jordan

Europe
British national grid reference system, Britain
 Lambert-93 (fr), the official projection in Metropolitan France
Hellenic Geodetic Reference System 1987, Greece
Irish grid reference system, Ireland
Irish Transverse Mercator, Ireland
 SWEREF 99 (sv), Sweden

North America
United States National Grid, US

Worldwide
Universal Transverse Mercator coordinate system
Lambert conformal conic projection
International mapcode system
Military Grid Reference System

Identifiers
A Spatial Reference System Identifier (SRID) is a unique value used to unambiguously identify projected, unprojected, and local spatial coordinate system definitions. These coordinate systems form the heart of all GIS applications.

Virtually all major spatial vendors have created their own SRID implementation or refer to those of an authority, such as the EPSG Geodetic Parameter Dataset.

SRIDs are the primary key for the Open Geospatial Consortium (OGC) spatial_ref_sys metadata table for the Simple Features for SQL Specification, Versions 1.1 and 1.2,  which is defined as follows:
CREATE TABLE SPATIAL_REF_SYS
(
    SRID      INTEGER   NOT NULL PRIMARY KEY,
    AUTH_NAME CHARACTER VARYING(256),
    AUTH_SRID INTEGER,
    SRTEXT    CHARACTER VARYING(2048)
)
In spatially enabled databases (such as IBM Db2, IBM Informix, Ingres, Microsoft SQL Server, MonetDB, MySQL, Oracle RDBMS, Teradata, PostGIS, SQL Anywhere and Vertica), SRIDs are used to uniquely identify the coordinate systems used to define columns of spatial data or individual spatial objects in a spatial column (depending on the spatial implementation).  SRIDs are typically associated with a well-known text (WKT) string definition of the coordinate system (SRTEXT, above).
Here are two common coordinate systems with their EPSG SRID value followed by their WKT:

UTM, Zone 17N, NAD27 — SRID 2029:
PROJCS["NAD27(76) / UTM zone 17N",
    GEOGCS["NAD27(76)",
        DATUM["North_American_Datum_1927_1976",
            SPHEROID["Clarke 1866",6378206.4,294.9786982138982,
                AUTHORITY["EPSG","7008"]],
            AUTHORITY["EPSG","6608"]],
        PRIMEM["Greenwich",0,
            AUTHORITY["EPSG","8901"]],
        UNIT["degree",0.01745329251994328,
            AUTHORITY["EPSG","9122"]],
        AUTHORITY["EPSG","4608"]],
    UNIT["metre",1,
        AUTHORITY["EPSG","9001"]],
    PROJECTION["Transverse_Mercator"],
    PARAMETER["latitude_of_origin",0],
    PARAMETER["central_meridian",-81],
    PARAMETER["scale_factor",0.9996],
    PARAMETER["false_easting",500000],
    PARAMETER["false_northing",0],
    AUTHORITY["EPSG","2029"],
    AXIS["Easting",EAST],
    AXIS["Northing",NORTH]]

WGS84 — SRID 4326  
GEOGCS["WGS 84",
    DATUM["WGS_1984",
        SPHEROID["WGS 84",6378137,298.257223563,
            AUTHORITY["EPSG","7030"]],
        AUTHORITY["EPSG","6326"]],
    PRIMEM["Greenwich",0,
        AUTHORITY["EPSG","8901"]],
    UNIT["degree",0.01745329251994328,
        AUTHORITY["EPSG","9122"]],
    AUTHORITY["EPSG","4326"]]

SRID values associated with spatial data can be used to constrain spatial operations — for instance, spatial operations cannot be performed between spatial objects with differing SRIDs in some systems, or trigger coordinate system transformations between spatial objects in others.

See also
Engineering datum
Geodesy
Geodetic datum
Georeferencing
Geographic coordinate systems
Geographic information system (GIS).
Grid reference
List of National Coordinate Reference Systems

References

External links

 spatialreference.org – A website that defines spatial reference systems, in a variety of formats.
 OpenGIS Specifications (Standards)
 OpenGIS Simple Features Specification for CORBA (99-054)
 OpenGIS Simple Features Specification for OLE/COM (99-050)
 OpenGIS Simple Features Specification for SQL (99-054, 05-134, 06-104r3)
 OGR — library implementing relevant OGC standards
 EPSG Geodetic Parameter Registry - search engine for EPSG defined reference systems
 EPSG.io/ - Full text search indexing over 6000 coordinate systems
 Galdos Systems INdicio CRS Registry

Geographic coordinate systems
Geographic information systems
Geodesy
ISO/TC 211
Open Geospatial Consortium
GIS file formats